Gün is a Turkish masculine given name and surname. Notable people with the name include:

Given name

First name
 Gün Sazak (1932–1980), Turkish politician
 Gün Temür Khan (1384–1402), Mongol Khagan of the Northern Yuan Dynasty

Middle name
 Emin Gün Sirer, Turkish-American computer scientist

Surname
 Bediha Gün (born 1994), Turkish wrestler

Turkish-language surnames
Turkish masculine given names